Kim Young-mi is a female former international table tennis player from South Korea.

Table tennis career
She won a silver medal for South Korea at the 1989 World Table Tennis Championships in the Corbillon Cup (women's team event) with Hong Soon-hwa, Hyun Jung-hwa and Kwon Mi-sook.

See also
 List of World Table Tennis Championships medalists

References

South Korean female table tennis players
Asian Games medalists in table tennis
Table tennis players at the 1986 Asian Games
Medalists at the 1986 Asian Games
Asian Games gold medalists for South Korea
World Table Tennis Championships medalists
20th-century South Korean women